Volkanovski is a Macedonian surname. Notable people with the surname include:

Alexander Volkanovski (born 1988), Australian professional mixed martial artist
Ivan Volkanovski (born 1999), Macedonian professional basketball player

Macedonian-language surnames
Surnames